Tommy Karl-Gustaf Olin (born 4 July 1962) is a Swedish curler and curling coach.

In 2002 he was inducted into the Swedish Curling Hall of Fame.

Teams

Record as a coach of national teams

References

External links
 

Living people
1962 births
Swedish male curlers
Swedish curling champions
Swedish curling coaches
20th-century Swedish people